

Films

1963 in LGBT history
LGBT
1963
1963